Janaesia exclusiva is a moth of the family Noctuidae. It is found in the Maule Region of Chile.

The wingspan is 41–45 mm. Adults are on wing from February to March.

External links
 Noctuinae of Chile

Noctuinae
Endemic fauna of Chile